Love, Peace & Soul is the fourth and final studio album by American R&B/Soul/Funk Girl group the Honey Cone. It was released by Hot Wax/Invictus Records in 1972 (see 1972 in music).

Album information
At the time of this album's release, Hot Wax was experiencing troubles in their operation. This time period marked a downward spiral that would eventually put the freshly developed record label out of business permanently the following year. A few sources report that the reason for this pending expiration was that the independent distributors weren't paying up when it came to royalties from radio play and record sales. The album proved to be the group's biggest failure both critically and commercially; it was their lowest charting album since their sophomore release 1971's Sweet Replies.

Despite the dismissal of both the group and their final album at the time, the legacy of Honey Cone was reaffirmed when Kanye West sampled the distinctive lead vocals of Edna Wright from the track "Innocent 'Til Proven Guilty" for Common's 2005 single "Testify" from his commercial breakthrough album Be. Edna Wright also made a cameo appearance in the video.

This album contains cover versions of The Miracles' staples "Ooo Baby Baby", "Who's Lovin' You", and the 1965 R&B hit "Stay in My Corner" by The Dells. The group disbanded shortly after the release of this album.

Track listing

Personnel
Honey Cone
Carolyn Willis
Edna Wright
Shelly Clark
Technical
Barney Perkins, Ed Redd - engineer
Ron Dunbar - executive producer

References

External links
 Love, Peace & Soul at Discogs

1972 albums
Hot Wax Records albums
Buddah Records albums